Berastegi is a town located in the province of Gipuzkoa, in the autonomous community of Basque Country, northern Spain, at the shores of the river Elduaran or Berastegi, at 1° 58' 45" west and 43° 07' 27" north, and at an altitude of 400 m. It borders Ibarra to the north, with Eldua to the east, and to the south and west with Belauntza.

References

External links
 BERASTEGI in the Bernardo Estornés Lasa - Auñamendi Encyclopedia (Euskomedia Fundazioa) Information available in Spanish

Municipalities in Gipuzkoa